Metriothrips is a genus of thrips in the family Phlaeothripidae.

Species
 Metriothrips angusticapitis
 Metriothrips bournieri
 Metriothrips mayri
 Metriothrips midas
 Metriothrips secundus
 Metriothrips tzararacuaensis

References

Phlaeothripidae
Thrips
Thrips genera